Rivers Guthrie is a retired American soccer midfielder who played professionally in the USL A-League and Major League Soccer.  He played the United States U-16 men's national soccer team at the 1989 FIFA U-16 World Championship.

In 1989, Guthrie played two games for the United States U-16 men's national soccer team at the 1989 FIFA U-16 World Championship.  Guthrie attended Clemson University, playing on the men’s soccer team from 1991 to 1994.  In 1995, he turned professional with the Colorado Rapids of the A-League.  That season, the Foxes went to the championship where they fell to the Montreal Impact.  Guthrie played one game with the Tampa Bay Terror during the 1995-1996 National Professional Soccer League season.  In 1996, Guthrie signed with the Tampa Bay Mutiny of Major League Soccer.  He never played for the Mutiny, but spent most of the season with the New Orleans Riverboat Gamblers of USISL.  In 1997, he returned to the Foxes but the team folded at the end of the season.  In February 1998, Guthrie signed with the Charleston Battery.  He moved to the Orange County Zodiac in 1999 and played for the team through 2000, but only played three games for them that season.  In 2001, he signed with the Atlanta Silverbacks.  In May, the Colorado Rapids called up Guthrie for one game.  The Silverbacks released him in July.

References

External links
 Charleston Battery: Rivers Guthrie
 Charleston Battery stats: Rivers Guthrie
 MLS: Rivers Guthrie

Living people
1972 births
Soccer players from Charlotte, North Carolina
American Professional Soccer League players
American soccer coaches
American soccer players
Atlanta Silverbacks players
Charleston Battery players
Clemson Tigers men's soccer players
Colorado Foxes players
Colorado Rapids players
Major League Soccer players
National Professional Soccer League (1984–2001) players
New Orleans Riverboat Gamblers players
Orange County Blue Star players
Tampa Bay Mutiny players
Tampa Bay Terror players
A-League (1995–2004) players
United States men's youth international soccer players
Association football midfielders